Brad Rader, who has sometimes signed his art Raider, is a comic book creator, storyboard artist and animation director. He won his Emmy in 1999 for his work on Todd McFarlane's Spawn.

Rader's comic work include the original noir graphic novel Fogtown for Vertigo and the self-published homoerotic graphic novel Harry and Dickless Tom; Catwoman, Gotham Adventures, and Batman Adventures for DC Comics.

Personal life
Rader was raised in Anchorage, Alaska, and now lives in Los Angeles, California.

References

External links

Page on Rader's homoerotic work from Leather Archives & Museum
Interview about Fogtown

American comics artists
Living people
American storyboard artists
American television directors
Year of birth missing (living people)